The municipal government of Montreal is composed of a borough council, a city council and an agglomeration council. Councillors are members of municipal political parties and are elected by the citizens. The executive committee is appointed by the mayor.

Montreal City Council

The Montreal City Council is the governing body of Montreal. It is the main organisational body of the City of Montreal. It establishes the political lines of the city's government and approves regulations of municipal application. The main decisions in areas like public security, intergovernmental relations, urban regeneration, environment and urban planning should be approved by the council. The 64 councillors are elected by direct universal suffrage in a majority system and have a mandate of four years.

Mayor of Montreal
 
The head of the city government is the mayor of Montreal, who is first among equals in the Montreal City Council. The mayor has municipal executive power. Supervises, manages and controls all of the City administration. The Mayor is elected by direct universal suffrage in a majority system. The Mayor's four-year mandate coincides with that of the Montreal City Council.

Executive committee
Executive Committee is an organ that depends on the Montreal City Council and which has its own decision-making powers. Is responsible for preparing different documents, such as budgets, contracts, subsidies, financial resources management, regulations, etc., subject to the approval of the City Council. This Council may delegate other powers to the executive committee. The Executive Council has currently twelve members, all appointed by the Mayor of Montreal.

Borough councils

The city of Montreal is divided into 19 boroughs (in French, arrondissements), each with a mayor and council. Borough-based organisations that assume part of the following authorities in their own territorial spheres: urban planning, solid waste collection, culture, social and community development, parks, cleaning, housing, human resources, fire prevention and financial management.

Leader of the Official Opposition

Montreal municipal elections

Municipal political parties
 
 Équipe Denis Coderre pour Montréal 
 Projet Montréal
 Vrai changement pour Montréal
 Coalition Montréal
 Mouvement Montreal

List of mayors of Montreal

References

External links
 Contact information for city councillors. Ville de Montréal.

 
Montreal